Bahk Jong-sun (born 1969) is a South Korean artist. He was born in North Chungcheong Province. He finds inspiration in the Korean furniture tradition dating back to the 17th and 18th centuries, as well as in the clean, linear forms of mid-century Scandinavian modernism.  Bahk is well known for his modernist forms created by using natural wood.

Work

Selected solo exhibitions
2010 Echo, Ishikawa International Salon, Kanazawa Time of Wood, Gallery SEOMI, Seoul
2009 Journey with Wood, Topohaus, Seoul The Journey to Somewhere, Gallery Corner, Seoul Water, Islet & Repose, Craft Awon, Seoul
2007 The Forest of Light and Sound, Craft Awon, Seoul
2006 Make a Sound in Wooden Furniture, Haslla Artworld, Gangwon The Sound of Landscape, Chiak Artcenter, Wonju, Gangwon
2005 Speak Seriously to the Tree, Gallery Leeham, Wonju, Gangwon

Selected group exhibitions
2015 Korea now! Design, Craft, Fashion and Graphic Design in Korea exhibition, Musée des Arts décoratifs, Paris, France
2015 Living in Art II, Connect, Seomi International, Los Angeles, CA, USA
2015 Living in Art, Seomi International, Los Angeles, CA, USA.
2013 Contemporary Korean Design 2, R20th Century Gallery, New York
2010 Contemporary Korean Design, R20th Century Design Gallery, New York
2009 A Collision of Sentiments, Acozza Gallery, Wonju, Gangwon
2008 Empty Project "The Light", Seogok Church, Wonju, Gangwon The Story of City at Three Persons, Samil Road Storage Theatre, Seoul
2005 Asia Pacific Weeks Berlin 2005 Focus Korea, Nomadic Plaza, Berlin

Awards
2011 Yumin Creative Awards, The Yumin Cultural Foundation & JoongAng Ilbo Newspaper, Korea

Collections
2011 Hana Bank Training Institute, Korea

Fairs
2015 Design Miami/Basel
2014 Design Miami/Basel, Basel
2013 Design Miami/Basel, Basel
2012 Design Miami/, Miami PAD, Pavilion of Art & Design, London Design Miami/Basel, Basel
2011 Design Miami/, Miami Design Miami/Basel, Basel
2010 Design Miami/, Miami Design Miami/Basel, Basel
2009 Design Miami/, Miami

References

External links
 

1969 births
Living people
People from North Chungcheong Province
South Korean artists